Pierre Colliard (30 April 1852, Jons – 19 May 1925) was a French politician belonging to the Republican-Socialist Party. He was a member of the Chamber of Deputies from 1898 to 1919. He was Minister of Labour and Social Security provisions from 1917 to 1919.

References

1852 births
1925 deaths
People from Rhône (department)
Politicians from Auvergne-Rhône-Alpes
Republican-Socialist Party politicians
French Ministers of Labour and Social Affairs
Members of the 7th Chamber of Deputies of the French Third Republic
Members of the 8th Chamber of Deputies of the French Third Republic
Members of the 9th Chamber of Deputies of the French Third Republic
Members of the 10th Chamber of Deputies of the French Third Republic
Members of the 11th Chamber of Deputies of the French Third Republic
French people of World War I